Pieter Harmensz Verelst (c. 1618, Dordrecht – c. 1678 in Dordrecht or Hulst) was a Dutch Golden Age painter. Three of his sons, Simon, Herman, and Johannes Verelst, also became painters.

Biography
Pieter Verelst was a pupil of Gerard Dou and Jacob Gerritsz Cuyp. In 1638, he became a member of the Dordrecht Guild of St. Luke. In 1643 he lived in the Hague near Jan van Goyen.  Verelst produced five supraportes for Huis ten Bosch. In 1651 he went broke. In 1656, he was one of the founders of the local Confrerie Pictura. His pupils were Hermanus van Grevenbroeck, Anthony de Haen, Otto Hoynck, Hendrik Mony, Gabriel Siebrick and his sons Herman, Johannes and Simon Pietersz Verelst. After his wife died he remarried in 1657. In 1660 he moved to Veerkade.

He is known mostly for genre paintings of Dutch and Italian village life. He moved in the 1670s to Hulst where he became a brewer.

Family tree

References

External links

Pieter Harmensz Verelst on Artnet.
Pieter Verelst at PubHist.
 https://www.theleidencollection.com/artists/pieter-verelst/

1610s births
1670s deaths
Dutch Golden Age painters
Dutch male painters
Dutch genre painters
Artists from Dordrecht
Painters from Dordrecht
Painters from The Hague